Sparkbrook and Small Heath is a defunct administrative district, formerly managed by its own district committee, in Birmingham, England.

Its boundaries were those of the Birmingham Sparkbrook and Small Heath parliamentary constituency.

External links 
Birmingham City Council's Sparkbrook and Small Heath pages

Areas of Birmingham, West Midlands